The Indonesian television mystery music game show I Can See Your Voice Indonesia was initially scheduled to premiere the fifth season on MNCTV on 18 January 2021, but it was delayed until it happened on 25 January 2021.

Due to the COVID-19 pandemic, this programme is filmed under health and safety protocols being implemented for this season.

Gameplay

Format
Under the original format, the guest artist can eliminate one or two mystery singers after each round. The game concludes with the last mystery singer standing which depends on the outcome of a duet performance with a guest artist.

Rewards
If the singer is good, he/she will feature on a privilege video; if the singer is bad, he/she wins .

Rounds
Each episode presents the guest artist with six people whose identities and singing voices are kept concealed until they are eliminated to perform on the "stage of truth" or remain in the end to perform the final duet.

Episodes

Guest artists

Panelists

Notes

References

I Can See Your Voice Indonesia
2021 Indonesian television seasons
Television series impacted by the COVID-19 pandemic